James Bamford White (June 6, 1842 – March 25, 1931) was an American educator, lawyer, Confederate  Civil War veteran, and politician who served one term as a U.S. Representative from Kentucky from 1901 to 1903.

Biography 
Born near Winchester, Kentucky, White attended the common schools and the Mount Zion Academy, Macon County, Illinois.

He entered the Confederate States Army in the fall of 1863 and served in the commands of Generals Breckinridge and Morgan until the close of the Civil War, when he was honorably discharged.

He engaged in teaching at Irvine, Kentucky.
He studied law while teaching.
He was admitted to the bar in 1867 and commenced the practice of law in Irvine.

He served as prosecuting attorney of Estill County 1872-1880.

Congress 
White was elected as a Democrat to the Fifty-seventh Congress (March 4, 1901 – March 3, 1903).

Later career and death 
He continued the practice of his profession in Irvine, Kentucky, until his retirement in 1919.

He died in Irvine, Kentucky, March 25, 1931.
He was interred in Oakdale Cemetery.

References

1842 births
1931 deaths
Confederate States Army soldiers
Kentucky lawyers
People from Clark County, Kentucky
Democratic Party members of the United States House of Representatives from Kentucky